The  Star Line was a fleet of ships owned by timber merchants, Messrs. James P Corry and Co Ltd. of Belfast, Ireland.  The shipping company was formed by Robert Corry in 1826 to import timber from Canada to Ireland. The company began to diversify in 1859 when trade with Calcutta began and the company relocated its offices from Belfast to London.  This was followed by services to Australia and New Zealand in 1888, South America in 1903 and a joint emigrant service to Australia with Royden and Tyser Lines started in 1912.   The company became a constituent part of the Commonwealth & Dominion Line in 1914, which was renamed Port Line in 1937.

In 1908, it had a fleet of seven modern cargo steamers engaged in trade with the East and Far East, with a gross tonnage of 34,900 tons.  The "Star Fleet" then consisted of the ships Star of Australia, Star of Japan, Star of England, Star of New Zealand, Star of Ireland, Star of Scotland and Star of Victoria.

Some of its sailing ships were sold to the Alaska Packers' Association.

Fleet

Early timber sailing vessels
James P Corry and Co Ltd commenced its shipping business starting with one ship, Great Britain, and gradually established a large fleet including the following vessels - Chieftain (built 1826), Summerhill (built 1840), Queen of the West (built 1843), Alabama (built 1851), Persian (built 1851), Saint Helena (built 1851) and Charger (built 1856).

Star Line

Sailing ships

Steam ships

The company operated the following steam ships starting in January 1887 - Star of Victoria (built 1886), Star of England (built 1889), Star of New Zealand (built 1895), Star of Australia (built 1899), Star of Scotland (built 1904), Star of Japan (built 1906), Star of Ireland (built 1903), Star of Canada (built 1909) and Star Of India (built 1910).

Gallery

References

Defunct shipping companies of the United Kingdom